Gymnopilus thiersii is a species of mushroom in the family Hymenogastraceae.

Description
This species is nearly identical to Gymnopilus luteofolius, but differs in having different context colors and dextrinoid spores. It contains the hallucinogenic drugs psilocybin and psilocin, and stains blue-green where damaged. The type location for G. thiersii is Wunderlich Park in San Mateo County, California.

See also

List of Gymnopilus species

External links
Gymnopilus thiersii at Index Fungorum
Original species description

thiersii